Kwon Da-kyung is a South Korean professional footballer who last played for Home United in the S.League. He plays as a midfielder.

Club career
Kwon played in the K League for his first club Seoul United. In 2013, he moved over to the S.League and played for Home United. He was released by Home United at the end of the 2014 season.

References

Living people
South Korean footballers
Expatriate footballers in Singapore
Expatriate sportspeople in Singapore
South Korean expatriate footballers
Home United FC players
Singapore Premier League players
Association football midfielders
Year of birth missing (living people)